The Mola or Molas is a hand-made textile that forms part of the traditional women's clothing of the indigenous Guna people from Panamá and Colombia, South America. The full costume includes a patterned wrapped skirt (saburet), a red and yellow headscarf (musue), arm and leg beads (wini), a gold nose ring (olasu) and earrings in addition to the mola blouse (dulemor).
 Two groups, Choco and Cuna lived side by side without intermarriage and without adopting a similar culture."10
In Dulegaya, the Guna's native language, "mola" means "shirt" or "clothing". The mola originated with the tradition of Guna women painting their bodies with geometric designs, using available natural colors; in later years these same designs were woven in cotton, and later still, sewn using cloth bought from the European settlers of Panamá.

Development of the style
 Two  groups, Choco a group who lives near the Isthmus known as Darien were the body painters. ,  
Molas  may have their origin in body painting. In 1514, Pasqual de Andagoya, arrived in Darian and wrote.. the women are very well dressed, in embroidered cotton mantles which extend down so as to cover their feet, but the arms and bosom are uncovered." 17 They did not wear blouses even in 1688 until they had been introduced by the missionaries.

Only after colonization by the Spanish and contact with missionaries did the Guna start to transfer their traditional geometric designs on fabric, first by painting directly on the fabric and later by using the technique of reverse appliqué. It is not agreed when this technique was first used. It seems to have been popular in the second half of the nineteenth century. 
In 1924, Lady Brown refers to the dress of the medicine man/ Kantules as "dressed up the knees in long  covered with cabalistic characters...all worked into, or let into, the cloth in a form of patchwork." 27

As an inspiration for their designs, the Guna first used the geometrical patterns which have been used for body painting before. In the past, they have also depicted realistic and abstract designs of flowers, sea animals and birds, and popular culture.

Depending on the tradition of each island, Guna women begin the crafting of molas either after they reach puberty, or at a much younger age. Women who prefer to dress in western style are in the minority as well as in the communities in Panama City.

Construction
Molas are hand-made using a reverse appliqué technique.  Several layers (usually two to seven) of different-colored cloth (usually cotton) are sewn together; the design is then formed by cutting away parts of each layer.  The edges of the layers are then turned under and sewn down.  Often, the stitches are nearly invisible. This is achieved by using a thread the same color as the layer being sewn, sewing blind stitches, and sewing tiny stitches. The finest molas have extremely fine stitching, made using tiny needles.

The largest pattern is typically cut from the top layer, and progressively smaller patterns from each subsequent layer, thus revealing the colors beneath in successive layers. This basic scheme can be varied by cutting through multiple layers at once, hence varying the sequence of colours; some molas also incorporate patches of contrasting colours, included in the design at certain points to introduce additional variations of color.

Molas vary greatly in quality, and the pricing to buyers varies accordingly.  A greater number of layers is generally a sign of higher quality; two-layer molas are common, but examples with four or more layers will demand a better price.  The quality of stitching is also a factor, with the stitching on the best molas being close to invisible. Although some molas rely on embroidery to some degree to enhance the design, those which are made using only the pure reverse-appliqué technique (or nearly so) are considered better.

Molas will often be found for sale with signs of use, such as stitch marks around the edges; such imperfections indicate that the mola was made for use, and not simply for sale to tourists.  A mola can take from two weeks to six months to make, depending on the complexity of the design.

Molas in Guna Culture

Several early influences were a small colony by Christopher Columbus in 1502, a scottish colony established in the south of Darien, 1698, the Calvinist or French Huguenots settled and married some Cuna women, even though they were killed in 1757, then in 1790 a Spanish colony. 2

By 1907, the traditional costume of a Guna woman consists of a patterned blue cotton wrapped skirt, red and yellow headscarf, arm and leg beads, gold nose rings and earrings and the many layered and finely sewn mola panel blouse.

The artistry of a mola reflects a synthesis of traditional Guna culture with the influences of the modern world. Mola art developed when Guna women had access to store bought yard goods. Mola designs are often inspired by modern graphics such as political posters, labels, pictures from books and TV cartoons, as well as traditional themes from Guna legends and culture.

Geometric molas are the most traditional, having developed from ancient body painting designs. Many hours of careful sewing are required to create a fine mola. The ability to make an outstanding mola is a source of status among Guna women.

The quality of a mola is determined by such factors as the number of layers, fineness of the stitching, evenness and width of cutouts, addition of details such as zigzag borders, lattice-work or embroidery, and general artistic merit of the design and color combination.

When Guna women tire of a particular blouse, they disassemble it and sell the molas to collectors. Since mola panels have been worn as part of the traditional dress of a Guna woman, they often show signs of wear such as fading and stitch marks along the edges of the panels. These "imperfections" indicate that the mola is authentic and not made solely to be sold to tourists.

Molas are often sold in pairs, the pair consisting of the back and front panels of a blouse. The two molas are usually two variations on a theme.  Matched molas complement each other and should be displayed or used together for the greatest impact.

Mola panels have many uses. They can be framed as art or made into pillows, place mats or wall hangings. Some people even make them into bedspreads or incorporate them into quilting projects.

Molas are very sturdy and well sewn. Authentic molas have already been washed many times and can be safely hand washed in warm water.

Molas may be purchased in Panama or in Colombia.

Banning of Molas 
In 1919, the panamanian government began a policy of forced assimilation banning mola's dress and nose piercing in women. The government introduced these laws to Westernize Guna society and assert control.

There was a strong link between traditional dress and Guna culture and identity. Molas have such an importance for the Guna people and their traditional identity that they can be considered responsible for the independent status of the Comarca Kuna Yala.

After the attempt of the Panamanian government to "westernize" the Guna, the Guna greatly objected to the control on their cultural dress, and ethnic identity, and showed great strength in their reaction to the bans implemented by the government, leading to the Guna Revolution. 

In 1925 for three years following the revolution, women were required to once again adopt traditional dress as a form of rebellion against the government. Women on Nargana and other more progressive islands were forced to wear mola, even if they had never worn this traditional dress, and their noses had to be pierced by force.

References

Further reading
Günther Hartmann, Molakana: Volkskunst der Cuna, Panama, Museum für Voelkerkunde, Berlin, 1980 .
Kit S. Kapp, Mola Art From the San Blas Islands, 1972.
Clyde E. Keeler, Secrets of the Cuna Earthmother: A Comparative Study of Ancient Religions Illustrated, New York: Exposition Press, 1960.
Ann Parker & Avon Neal, Molas: Folk Art of the Cuna Indians, New York: Barre Publishing, 1977. .
Michel Perrin, Magnificent Molas: The Art of the Kuna Indians, Paris, Flammarion, 1999. .
Salvador, Mari Lyn.  Kuna Women’s Arts:  Molas, Meanings and Markets.  Crafting Gender:  Women and Folk art in Latin America and the Caribbean. Eli Barta (ed).  Durham, NC:  Duke University Press.  2003.
2. Enrique Chaves and Linnea Angermuller, About Molas, Florida State Univ. 1969

10 F. Louis Hoover, Molas from the San Blas Islands, NY, Center for Inter American relations, 1968

17 Clyde E. Keeler, Cuna Indian Art, 1969

27, Herta Puls, The Art of Cutwork and Applique, Historic Modern & Kuna Indian, 1978

External links
 The Art of Being Kuna, from The San Diego Museum of Man.  Retrieved February 19, 2006. Link Broken 7/17/19.
 Molas: the Textile Art of Panama, from The University of Missouri.  Retrieved February 19, 2006. Link Broken 7/17/19.
 Rainforest Art.  Retrieved February 19, 2006. Link Broken 7/17/19.
 Fashioning Identity: Native tradition meets artistic innovation in the mola textiles of Guna women
  "About Molas"March 26, 2008.
  " Mola HistoryJune 16, 2006

Indigenous textile art of the Americas
Panamanian art
Colombian art
Circum-Caribbean culture